Hyalinobatrachium duranti is a species of frog in the family Centrolenidae. It is endemic to the Cordillera de Mérida, Venezuela. In Spanish it is known as ranita de cristal de Durant. Its natural habitats are montane cloud forests where it occurs along cascading mountain streams. Its status is insufficiently known.

References

duranti
Amphibians of the Andes
Amphibians of Venezuela
Endemic fauna of Venezuela
Taxa named by Juan A. Rivero
Amphibians described in 1985
Taxonomy articles created by Polbot